Mullah Abdul Rauf Aliza, widely identified as Mullah Abdul Rauf Khadim, was a Taliban member held in extrajudicial detention in the United States Guantanamo Bay detention camp, in Cuba, until 20 December 2007. His Guantanamo Internment Serial Number was 108.

Following his release from detention, he returned to Afghanistan to fight alongside the Taliban, becoming a provincial-level military commander. After falling out with the Taliban leadership, Rauf swore allegiance to the Islamic State of Iraq and the Levant (ISIL) and was named deputy commander for its Afghanistan-Pakistan based Wilayah Khorasan branch, before being killed by a US drone strike in February 2015.

Background
Abdul Rauf claimed that he was from Helmand Province in Afghanistan, and that an injury from a Soviet land mine had left him too injured for military duties, so he had been employed providing food during his Taliban conscription. Having become a foot soldier for several known Taliban commanders, he eventually became a member of Taliban leader Mullah Omar’s elite mobile reserve force before the attacks on 11 September 2001. He was the Taliban's last Governor of Kunar Province.

Identity confusion
On 4 March 2010, the Associated Press reported that two former captives at Guantanamo had become senior Taliban leaders, after their release from Afghan custody.
The report quoted "senior Afghan officials who said the two captives named Abdul Qayyum Zakir and Abdul Rauf Aliza were actually Abdul Qayyum and Abdul Rauf." They reported that Abdul Qayyum was being considered for as a candidate to replace recently captured Taliban second-in-command Mullah Abdul Ghani Baradar, and that Abdul Rauf was his deputy. The News International reported that both Abdul Qayyum Zakir and Abdul Rauf were members of the Taliban's Quetta Shura, which is based in Quetta, Pakistan, and that they had been captured shortly after Baradar.

Journalist Kathy Gannon of the Associated Press quoted former Helmand Governor Sher Mohammad Akhundzada about Abdul Rauf's role in the Taliban. Akhundzada asserted that prior to his initial capture in 2001 Abdul Rauf was a corps commander in Herat Province, and in Kabul.

Official status reviews
Originally, the George W. Bush Presidency asserted that captives apprehended in the "war on terror" were not covered by the Geneva Conventions, and could be held indefinitely, without charge, and without an open and transparent review of the justifications for their detention.
In 2004 the United States Supreme Court ruled, in Rasul v. Bush, that Guantanamo captives were entitled to being informed of the allegations justifying their detention, and were entitled to try to refute them.

Office for the Administrative Review of Detained Enemy Combatants

Following the Supreme Court's ruling the Department of Defense set up the Office for the Administrative Review of Detained Enemy Combatants.

A Summary of Evidence memo was prepared for his 2004 Combatant Status Review Tribunal, listing six allegations that justified his confinement.
The allegations accused Abdul Rauf of joining the Taliban in 1998 and received military training.
The allegations stated that Abdul Rauf: was issued a Kalishnikov rifle in Kunduz; fought for the Taliban; surrendered to Abdul Rashid Dostum's Northern Alliance forces; and was in possession of a Kalishnikov when he surrendered.

Abdul Rauf chose to participate in his Combatant Status Review Tribunal.
The Department of Defense published a three-page summarized transcript on March 3, 2006.

A two-page Summary of Evidence memo was drafted for Abdul Rauf Aliza's first annual Administrative Review Board in 2005.
The allegations from the 2005 memo added the following assertions: that Abdul Rauf claimed to be an involuntary conscript; that he had a handicap that meant that he could only be used as a delivery boy; that he "was identified as Mullah Abdul Rauf, a Taliban troop commander"; and that he was part of a small squad of conscripts who guarded a "communication building called Sadarat in Konduz".

The Department of Defense published a seven-page transcript from his review.

Four pages of heavily redacted decision memos were published in September 2007, indicating that Abdul Rauf Aliza was one of the 121 captives whose 2005 review recommended should be released of transferred.
His memo was drafted on April 21, 2005, and Gordon R. England, the Designated Civilian Official who had the authority to clear him for release or transfer, initialed his authorization to transfer Abdul Rauf Aliza on 22 April 2005.

Formerly secret Joint Task Force Guantanamo assessment

On April 25, 2011, whistleblower organization WikiLeaks published formerly secret assessments drafted by Joint Task Force Guantanamo analysts.
His JTF-GTMO assessment was three pages long, and was dated October 26, 2004.
It started with a recommendation to his Administrative Review Board that he should be transferred from Guantanamo, for further detention, and characterized him as of low intelligence value and as a medium threat.
The memo was signed by camp commandant Jay W. Hood.

In an article that conflated Abdul Rauf Aliza with a senior Taliban leader named Mullah Abdul Rauf, The Washington Post quoted from his formerly secret Joint Task Force Guantanamo assessment:

Assessed not to be a threat, Rauf was recommended for transfer out and continued detainment in another country.

Death
Mullah Abdul Rauf was killed in a US Air Force drone strike in the Helmand Province on 9 February 2015. It was said that the car he was travelling in was filled with ammunition and exploded. Rauf, his brother-in-law, and four Pakistani militants were said to have been killed.

References

External links
 The Stories of the Afghans Just Released from Guantánamo: Intelligence Failures, Battlefield Myths and Unaccountable Prisons in Afghanistan (Part One) Andy Worthington

2015 deaths
People from Helmand Province
Block D, Pul-e-Charkhi prison
Guantanamo detainees known to have been released
Afghan extrajudicial prisoners of the United States
Deaths by United States drone strikes in Afghanistan
Assassinated ISIL members
1981 births